Mohammed El Amine Belferar (born 16 February 1991) is an Algerian male middle-distance runner who competed in the 800 metres. He represented his country at the 2016 Summer Olympics and the World Championships in Athletics in 2013.

He first appeared internationally in 2013: after a run of 1:46.07 minutes in the capital Algiers. He gained selection for the 2013 World Championships in Athletics as a result and competed in the heats only. A member of the Algerian Armed Forces, he ran at the 2015 Military World Games and came fifth with a time close to his best at 1:46.46 minutes.

Belferar set a new personal best of 1:45.01 minutes in Barcelona and was selected to represent Algeria at the 2016 Summer Olympics, where he reached the semi-finals.

International competitions

References

External links

Living people
1991 births
Algerian male middle-distance runners
Olympic athletes of Algeria
Athletes (track and field) at the 2016 Summer Olympics
World Athletics Championships athletes for Algeria
Islamic Solidarity Games competitors for Algeria
Islamic Solidarity Games medalists in athletics
21st-century Algerian people
20th-century Algerian people